Poor Liza (Bednaja Liza) is a 1792 short story or sentimental novella by the Russian author Nikolay Karamzin. It is one of Karamzin's best-known short stories in Russia, where it is part of the school curriculum. It is the tale of two lovers that belong to different social classes which in this case is a young nobleman and a poor peasant girl. The story popularized the sentimentalized peasant girl in 19th-century Russia.

Summary

Liza is a poor serf girl who lives with her elderly, sick mother. Her father died, making Liza the breadwinner of her family at age 15. One of Liza's primary ways of making money is to sell flowers she picked in Moscow.

Two years later, while Liza is selling lily-of-the-valley flowers, she meets a handsome, rich man named Erast. They fall in love, and begin spending many nights together, next to the Simonov Monastery lake. At Erast's request, Liza keeps him a secret from her mother. What Liza does not know is that Erast, despite a good heart, is weak, fickle, and lecherous. Erast wants to have a pure love with Liza but finds his desire for her growing by the day.

One summer evening, Liza comes to Erast in tears, as her mother wants her to marry a well-off man who she does not love. She declares she can only love Erast, and in the heat of the moment, she loses her virginity to him. Erast promises he will marry Liza, but in reality, he has lost interest in her, as she has become impure to him.

In the autumn, Erast tells Liza that he is going off to war and leaves her. Two months later, when Liza comes to the city, she discovers the truth: in the army, he lost all his money in gambling, and married a rich widow to escape his debt. He gives her a hundred rubles, and tells her to forget him. In her grief, Liza drowns herself in the lake of the monastery garden where she and Erast had spent their time together.

Reception and legacy
Karamzin was a major figure in Russian sentimentalism, and Poor Liza introduced sentimentalism to the Russian public. First, it was widely loved, with many making a pilgrimage to the lake where Liza drowns herself. As time went on, however, it became an object of mockery, with authors like Pushkin making parodic usage of the name Liza in Queen of Spades and Mistress-turned-maid.

The name of Erast Fandorin, the eponymous hero of the detective fiction series, is a direct reference to the novella, for Erast's mother Liza dies in childbirth, and the bitter father names his child Erast for having caused Liza's death. Throughout the series, Erast only falls in love with women named Liza, and they all end with horrible fates.

Depictions

In film
 Poor Liza (2000), dir. Slava Tsukerman
 Poor Liza (Bednaya Liza) (1978), dir.

In theatre
 Original production by Bryantsev Youth Theatre, 2018
 Original production by Theatre of Nations
 Original production by Tovstonogov Bolshoi Drama Theater, 1970s

References

18th-century literature
18th-century Russian literature
Russian short stories
Romance short stories